Phyllonoma is a genus consisting of 4 species of trees and shrubs. Phyllonoma is the sole genus in the family Phyllonomaceae (an alternative name for the family is Dulongiaceae). Phyllonoma species are native to South and Central America (from Peru to Mexico).

They can be recognized by the structure of their flowers (like the Helwingiaceae, they have epiphyllous inflorescences).

The APG II classification (2003) places them in the order Aquifoliales, along with the hollies and Helwingiaceae.

In the Cronquist classification (1981) this family does not exist: the genus Phyllonoma is included in the family Grossulariaceae (gooseberry or currant family).

References

External links

Aquifoliales - Angiosperm Phylogeny Website, consulted 2007-02-04.
Dulongiaceae, Watson, L., and Dallwitz, M.J. 1992 onwards. The families of flowering plants: descriptions, illustrations, identification, and information retrieval. Version: 29 July 2006.
Phyllonomaceae from NCBI-Taxonomy
Phyllonomaceae, USDA, ARS, National Genetic Resources Program. Germplasm Resources Information Network - (GRIN Online Database). National Germplasm Resources Laboratory, Beltsville, Maryland. Consulted 2007-02-04.

Aquifoliales
Asterid genera